Diego López de Zúñiga y Velasco, 4th Count of Nieva (c. 1510 – February 20, 1564 in Lima, Peru) was the fourth viceroy of Peru, from April 17, 1561 to his death on February 20, 1564.

Early career
López de Zúñiga was a knight of the military Order of Santiago, and from 1553 to 1559, governor of Galicia. He was named Peruvian viceroy in late 1560 by King Philip II to replace Andrés Hurtado de Mendoza, 3rd Marquis of Cañete, who had been recalled. López de Zúñiga arrived in Lima and took up the office on February 20, 1561. After his arrival in Peru but before reaching the capital, he sent impertinent messages to his predecessor, just before the death of the latter. Some said that the recall and the insulting communications from López de Zúñiga had brought about the death of Hurtado de Mendoza.

Viceroy of Peru

On December 14, 1561 he ordered Gómez de Tordoya to explore the River Tono, and on December 24, 1561 he commissioned Juan Nieto to conquer the territory of Camaná.

In 1562, the city of Santiago del Estero (today in Tucumán province, Argentina) was founded by Francisco de Aguirre on orders of the viceroy. The following year the Audiencia of Quito was established. López de Zúñiga also founded the city of Safia (Santiago de Miraflores) and directed Cristóbal de Valverde to found San Gerónimo de Ica. He founded the town of Arnedo (now Chancay) with the intention of moving the University of San Marcos there, for its tranquility.

He began the construction of the entrances that surround the Plaza Mayor in Lima. These were destroyed in the earthquake of October 20, 1687, but later rebuilt.

In addition, he directed the separation of the diocese of Chile from that of Peru. He organized and improved schools for the sons of Indigenous leaders. Doña Ana de Solórzano founded a school for poor girls in 1562. López de Zúñiga favored the monasteries, ordered the construction of an aqueduct to bring potable water to Lima, and passed laws for the improvement of the government of the colony. During his term in office he sent 651,000 ducats to the royal treasury in Spain. He was the first viceroy of Peru to introduce the pomp of a viceregal court, with much attention paid to details of etiquette, ceremony and precedence.

Death
On February 1, 1564 he issued an edict setting a curfew for 10 p.m. in the city of Lima. On the following February 20, at midnight, four figures with their faces completely covered were seen violating the curfew. They entered the street of Trapitos and took up positions outside one of the houses there. At night this street was one of the most deserted in the city. The block in question was made up of four houses, none of which opened on Trapitos. There were no doors, but there were some balconies overlooking the street. Shortly after the arrival of the masked men, a rope ladder was thrown down from one of these balconies, and a man wrapped in a cape began to descend. Just before he reached the street, the four men lying in wait began to beat him with sandbags.

There was a single witness to these events, a young man taking the air on the balcony of the Zárate family residence nearby. This man was thought to be Pedro de Zárate. He called to his slaves, and together with them he went to investigate the incident. When they arrived, they found the victim dead and the assailants gone. And they discovered that the victim was in fact Viceroy López de Zúñiga y Velasco, apparently returning from a late-night tryst. Zárate was the son of one of the judges of the Audiencia of Lima, and this court was assembled to decide what action to take. The decision was made to move the body to the viceregal palace, and to announce that the viceroy had died of a sudden attack of apoplexy.

This was done, but rumors circulated concerning the other explanation of the viceroy's death. It was said that the woman involved was Catalina López de Zúñiga, a cousin of the viceroy and wife of Rodrigo Manrique de Lara. The later was said to have hired the assassins.

This account is the one currently accepted, but it is not certain that it is true. The viceroy was known for his affairs, so perhaps his reputation alone generated the rumors. At least one medical paper (see the fourth reference below) claims to have found evidence that the viceroy died of a stroke, presumably in his palace.

The body of López de Zúñiga y Velasco was interred in the church of San Francisco, and later transferred to Spain.

References
 Porras Barrenechea, Raúl, and Rubén Vargas Ugarte, Historia general de los Peruanos. Vol 2. El Perú Virreinal. Lima. Talleres Gráficos, 1977.

External links
 Governors of Galicia
 Brief biography
 Medical analysis of the evidence of the cause of death of the viceroy

1510 births
1564 deaths
Year of birth uncertain
People from Valladolid
Viceroys of Peru
Counts of Spain
Knights of Santiago